None So Live is a live album by Canadian technical death metal band Cryptopsy. It was recorded June 1, 2002 at The Medley in Montreal, Quebec, Canada and was released after Mike DiSalvo left the band; it is the only release to feature Martin Lacroix on vocals.  After his leaving, Lacroix would become an illustrator and tattooist, he would even create the album cover for the proceeding Cryptopsy full length Once Was Not, which was released in 2005.

Track-mixing for None So Live was done by Pierre Rémillard and artwork was provided by François Quévillon, who also did the art for previous Cryptopsy releases.

Track listing

Personnel

Cryptopsy
 Martin Lacroix – vocals
 Jon Levasseur – guitars
 Alex Auburn – guitars, vocals
 Eric Langlois – bass
 Flo Mounier – drums, backing vocals

Additional personnel
 Mylène Plante – photography
 Pierre Rémillard – mixing
 François Quévillon – artwork, design
 Kaz Choucri – recording
 Fred LanTeigne – recording assistant

Cryptopsy albums
2003 live albums
Century Media Records live albums